Kahaum pillar is an  structure located in Khukhundoo in the state of Uttar Pradesh, and dates to the reign of Gupta Empire ruler Skandagupta. The 5th century an  pillar known as Kahaum pillar was erected during the reign of Skandagupta. This pillar has carvings of Parshvanatha and other tirthankars with Jain Brahmi script.

Description 

Kahaum pillar is a grey-sandstone was erected during the reign of Skandagupta, Gupta Empire. According to inscription of the pillar, the pillar was erected by the Skandagupta in the Jyeshtha month of year 141 of the Gupta era (A.D. 460–61). The pillar was erected by Skandagupta upon receiving counsil from Madra.

The inscription is written in Sanskrit language, and written in verses except for the first word, siddhaṁ. The inscription defines reign of Skandagupta as peaceful and describes him as "commandar of a hundred kings". The inscription also has an adoration to Arihant of Jainism.

There is carving of five Jain Tirthankara in kayotsarga posture — one in a niche square face, two below the circular stone and two on the pinnacle of the column. These images are identified to be of Rishabhanatha, Shantinatha, Neminatha, Parshvanatha and Mahavira. According to inscription, these images were carved by Madra who is described as devotee of dvija, guru and yati.

Inscription

See also 
 Gupta art
 Pataini temple
 Bhitari pillar inscription of Skandagupta

Notes

References

Citation

Sources

Books

Web

External links

Jain art
Gupta art
Gupta and post-Gupta inscriptions
Buildings and structures completed in the 5th century
5th-century inscriptions
Sanskrit inscriptions in India